Sergi Samper Montaña (born 20 January 1995) is a Spanish professional footballer who plays for Japanese club Vissel Kobe as a defensive midfielder.

Formed at Barcelona from the age of six, he played mainly in the reserve team and made 13 first-team appearances, of which only one in La Liga, where he played 22 further games for Granada and Las Palmas. In 2019 he moved to Vissel Kobe, playing over 100 games and winning the Emperor's Cup in his first year.

Club career

Barcelona
Born in Barcelona, Catalonia, Samper joined FC Barcelona's youth setup in 2001 at age 6, after a successful trial. On 9 May 2013, he signed a four-year professional contract.

On 10 June 2013, Samper was promoted to the reserves who competed in Segunda División. He made his professional debut on 17 August in a 2–1 away defeat against CD Mirandés, appearing in a further 39 matches during the season to help to a third-place finish.

Samper made his first-team debut on 17 September 2014, starting in a 1–0 home victory over APOEL FC in the group stage of the UEFA Champions League; this made him the first player to rise through all of the ranks from the age of six. His first match in La Liga took place the following 12 March, when he came on as a 59th-minute substitute for Andrés Iniesta in the 6–0 home rout of Getafe CF.

In July 2016, Samper extended his contract until 2019 with a one-year further option and a buyout clause of €50 million, and in the following month he joined Granada CF on a season-long loan. After the Andalusians relegation, he was not issued a squad number in August 2017 by Barcelona manager Ernesto Valverde and was sent to UD Las Palmas on another temporary deal. The spell was cut short in January 2019 after a fibula fracture and left-ankle internal ligament break.

Vissel Kobe
On 4 March 2019, Samper terminated his contract with Barcelona and left the Camp Nou after 18 years. Three days later, he joined J1 League club Vissel Kobe on a four-year contract.

Playing alongside former Barcelona players Iniesta and David Villa, Samper won the Emperor's Cup in his first year in Japan, but was absent from the final victory over Kashima Antlers. The following 8 February he started in the Super Cup, a penalty shootout win over Yokohama F. Marinos after a 3–3 draw.

International career
Samper won his first cap for the Spain under-21 team on 12 November 2014 at the age of 19, playing the entire 1–4 friendly home loss to Belgium.

Personal life
Samper's older brother Jordi, is a professional tennis player. He played the game himself, until choosing football at six. 

Samper has type 1 diabetes, and befriended Borja Mayoral, who shares his condition, in the Spanish youth teams.

Club statistics

Honours
Barcelona
La Liga: 2015–16
Copa del Rey: 2014–15, 2015–16
Supercopa de España: 2016
UEFA Champions League: 2014–15
FIFA Club World Cup: 2015

Vissel Kobe
Emperor's Cup: 2019
Japanese Super Cup: 2020

References

External links

FC Barcelona official profile

1995 births
Living people
Spanish footballers
Footballers from Barcelona
Association football midfielders
La Liga players
Segunda División players
Segunda División B players
FC Barcelona Atlètic players
FC Barcelona players
Granada CF footballers
UD Las Palmas players
J1 League players
Vissel Kobe players
UEFA Champions League winning players
Spain youth international footballers
Spain under-21 international footballers
Catalonia international footballers
Spanish expatriate footballers
Expatriate footballers in Japan
Spanish expatriate sportspeople in Japan
People with type 1 diabetes